Lisa Petry (born 12 February 2001) is a Belgian footballer who plays as a forward for Women's Super League club KRC Genk and the Belgium women's national team.

References

2001 births
Living people
Belgian women's footballers
Women's association football forwards
Standard Liège (women) players
Belgium women's international footballers
KRC Genk Ladies players
Belgium women's youth international footballers